Mike Watson is a former American football coach.  He served as the head football coach at North Park College—now known as North Park University—in Chicago for two seasons, from 1973 to 1974, compiling a record of 6–12.

Head coaching record

References

Year of birth missing (living people)
Living people
North Park Vikings football coaches